Lat Rud (also Romanized as Lat Rūd; also known as Līt Rūd) is a village in Shuil Rural District, Rahimabad District, Rudsar County, Gilan Province, Iran. At the 2006 census, its population was 83, in 28 families.

References 

Populated places in Rudsar County